The lesser Antillean bullfinch (Loxigilla noctis) is a species of bird in the family Thraupidae.
It is found in Saint Barth, Saint Martin, Anguilla, Antigua and Barbuda, Dominica, Grenada, Guadeloupe, Martinique, Montserrat, Netherlands Antilles, Saint Kitts and Nevis, Saint Lucia, Saint Vincent and the Grenadines, the British Virgin Islands, and the U.S. Virgin Islands.

Its natural habitats are subtropical or tropical dry forest, subtropical or tropical moist lowland forest, and heavily degraded former forest.

Taxonomy
The lesser Antillean bullfinch was formally described by the Swedish naturalist Carl Linnaeus in 1766 in the twelfth edition of his Systema Naturae under the binomial name Fringilla noctis. Linnaeus's description was primary based on "Le Père Noir" that French zoologist Mathurin Jacques Brisson had described and illustrated in 1760. The specific epithet noctis is from the Latin nox meaning "night". The Lesser Antillean bullfinch is now placed in the genus Loxigilla that was introduced in 1831 by René Lesson.

Eight subspecies are recognised:
 L. n. coryi (Ridgway, 1898) – northwest Lesser Antilles
 L. n. ridgwayi (Cory, 1892) – US Virgin Islands and north Lesser Antilles
 L. n. desiradensis Danforth, 1937 – La Désirade (north-central Lesser Antilles)
 L. n. dominicana (Ridgway, 1898) – north-central Lesser Antilles
 L. n. noctis (Linnaeus, 1766) – Martinique
 L. n. sclateri Allen, JA, 1880 – Saint Lucia
 L. n. crissalis (Ridgway, 1898) – Saint Vincent
 L. n. grenadensis (Cory, 1892) – Grenada

In 2006 the Barbados bullfinch (Loxigilla barbadensis) was elevated to the species level; previously the species had been considered as the only non-sexually dimorphic subspecies of the Lesser Antillean bullfinch.

Gallery

References

External links

Saint Barth Fauna & Flora 

lesser Antillean bullfinch
Birds of the Lesser Antilles
lesser Antillean bullfinch
lesser Antillean bullfinch
Taxonomy articles created by Polbot